Libby Sibly Waye (14 January 1885 – 10 June 1951) was an Australian sportsman who represented South Australia in cricket and played in the South Australian Football League for West Torrens and South Adelaide.

Waye was the leading goal-kicker for West Torrens in the 1907 season, with 21 goals. He continued playing with the club until 1911, when he joined South Adelaide. Waye was also a member of the South Adelaide committee.

His success in grade cricket earned him a call up to the South Australian cricket team in the 1912-13 Sheffield Shield season, for a first-class match against Victoria at the Melbourne Cricket Ground. Waye batted at 10 in the first innings, yet was only the seventh bowler used and bowled just one over when it came to South Australia's time to field. He was promoted to five in the second innings but made a duck, to go with his earlier score of two.

Waye, who worked as a postal employee, fought on the Western Front with the 12th Battalion of the First Australian Imperial Force during World War I.

References

1885 births
Australian rules footballers from South Australia
West Torrens Football Club players
South Adelaide Football Club players
Australian cricketers
South Australia cricketers
Australian military personnel of World War I
1951 deaths
Southern Football League (South Australia) players
Sturt Football Club players
People from Willunga, South Australia